Adarsha Kotwal is a rural municipality in Bara District in Province No. 2 of Nepal. It was formed in 2016 occupying current 8 sections (wards) from previous 8 former VDCs. It occupies an area of 36.25 km2 with a total population of 27,552.

References 

Rural municipalities of Nepal established in 2017
Populated places in Bara District
Rural municipalities in Madhesh Province